Bianor senegalensis is a jumping spider species in the genus Bianor that lives in Senegal. The male was first identified in 2001.

References

Salticidae
Spiders described in 2001
Spiders of Africa